HD 27631 is a G-class yellow dwarf star located 164.3 ± 0.3 light-years from Earth. It is smaller and cooler than the Sun, with 0.94 ± 0.04 of its mass and a surface temperature of 5737±36 K. It is thought to be 4.4 ± 3.6 billion years old.

A survey in 2015 have ruled out the existence of any stellar companions at projected distances above 40 astronomical units.

Planetary system
From 1998 to 2012, the star was under observance from "the CORALIE echelle spectrograph at La Silla Observatory".

In 2012, a long-period, wide-orbiting exoplanet was deduced by radial velocity. This was published in November.

References

External links
 

Horologium (constellation)
Planetary systems with one confirmed planet
Durchmusterung objects
027631
020199
G-type subgiants